John Brenkman is an American historian of American literature, currently a Distinguished Professor and Department Chair at Baruch College, City University of New York, and also a published author. He is also a founding editor of the Duke University journal Social Text.

References

Living people
City University of New York faculty
Baruch College faculty
American literary historians
University of Iowa alumni
University of Wisconsin–Madison faculty
Northwestern University faculty
Academic staff of the University of Paris
Year of birth missing (living people)